Košrags (Livonian: Kuoštrõg) is a populated place in Kolka Parish, Talsi Municipality, Latvia on the shore of the Irbe Strait of the Baltic Sea.
One of twelve Livonian villages on the Līvõd rānda - the Livonian Coast in Courland (Kurzeme).
Other names: Kosraga, Koshragutsiems, Košraga, Košrags, Košraguciems, Kosraga Ciems, Kosraguciems, Košraga Ciems

Košrags's farm "Kukini" was mentioned in 1680 chronicles for the first time. Košrags is considered the newest of Liv villages from Kurzeme coast. It was formed in the 17th century.  By 1770 there were four old farms in Kosrags (Kine Diki, Kukini, Tilmaci and Zoki). Two tenant-farmer habitations  existed in 1896, and another seven habitations after 1905.

The houses in the village were built rather densely along the two roads:
 an old littoral road connecting all 16 Livs' fishermen villages at that time;
 the fishermen's road leading from the littoral road - it connected the villages with the working place near the sea. 
These roads have preserved their ancient shape till the present day.

Livonian priest and ethnologist Edgar Vaalgamaa was born in Košrags.

See also 
Livonian people

References 
Livs' village "Kosrags"

Towns and villages in Latvia
Talsi Municipality
Courland